The Gato class of submarines were built for the United States Navy and launched in 1941–1943. Named after the lead ship of the class, they were the first mass-production U.S. submarine class of World War II. 

The Gatos, along with the closely related  and es that followed, accounted for most of the Navy's World War II submarines; they destroyed much of the Japanese merchant marine and a large portion of the Imperial Japanese Navy. In some references, the Gatos are combined with their successors, especially the Balao class.

Gatos name comes from a species of small catshark. Like most other U.S. Navy submarines of the period, boats of the Gato class were given the names of marine creatures.

Design

AA-1 class and V-boats
The Gato-class boats were considered to be fleet submarines, designed to operate as adjuncts to the main battle fleet, based on standard-type battleships since World War I. They were to scout out ahead of the fleet and report on the enemy fleet's composition, speed, and course, then they were to attack and whittle down the enemy in preparation for the main fleet action, a titanic gun battle between battleships and cruisers. This was an operational concept born from experience in World War I. To operate effectively in this role, a submarine had to have high surface speed, long range and endurance, and heavy armament. Limitations in submarine design and construction in the 1920s and 1930s made this combination of qualities very difficult to achieve.

Tambor and Gar class
By 1931, the experimental phase of fleet submarine development was over and the Navy began to make solid progress towards what would eventually be the Gato class. By 1940, a much better developed industrial base and experience gained from the Porpoise-, -, and  boats resulted in the Tambor and Gar classes. Finally, the U.S. Navy had hit the right combination of factors and now had the long-desired fleet submarine.

Timing, however, conspired against the actual use of these boats in their assigned role. The attack on Pearl Harbor on 7 December 1941 destroyed the Pacific Fleet battle line and along with it the concept of the battleship-led gun battle, as well as 20 years of submarine strategic concept development. It left the fleet submarine without a mission. Fortunately, the same capabilities that would have enabled these submarines to operate with the fleet made them superbly qualified for their new mission of commerce raiding against the Japanese Empire.

Timing, however, also conspired to make the Gatos a mass-produced class of submarines. Six units were planned in FY41. In the immediate aftermath of the Two-Ocean Navy Act 48 additional units were ordered. By the end of 1941, 33 Gato keels had been laid.

Gato class
The Gato-class design, with a top range of 11,000 nautical miles (20,000 km), was a near-duplicate of the preceding Tambor- and Gar-class boats. The Gatos, along with nearly all of the U.S. Navy fleet-type submarines of World War II, were of partial double-hulled construction. The inner pressure-resisting hull was wrapped by an outer, hydrodynamic hull. The voids between the two hulls provided space for fuel and ballast tanks. The outer hull merged with the pressure hull at both ends in the area of the torpedo room bulkheads, hence the "partial" double hull. Operational experience with earlier boats led the naval architects and engineers at the Navy's Bureau of Construction and Repair to believe that they had been unduly conservative in their estimates of hull strength. Without changing the construction or thickness of the pressure hull steel, they decided that the Gato-class boats would be fully capable of routinely operating at 300 feet, a  increase in test depth over the preceding classes.

The Gatos were slow divers when compared to some German and British designs, but that was mostly because the Gatos were significantly larger boats. Sufficient fuel bunkerage to provide the range necessary for 75-day patrols from Hawaii to Japan and back could be obtained only with a larger boat, which would take longer to submerge than a smaller one. Acknowledging this limitation, the bureau designers incorporated a negative (sometimes called a "down express") tank into the design, which was flooded to provide a large amount of negative buoyancy at the start of the dive. Based on later wartime experience, the tank was normally kept full or nearly full at the surface, then emptied to a certain mark after the boat was submerged to restore neutral buoyancy. At the start of the war, these boats could go from fully surfaced to periscope depth in about 45–50 seconds. The superstructure that sat atop the pressure hull provided the main walking deck when the boat was surfaced and was free-flooding and full of water when the boat was submerged. When the dive began, the boat would "hang" for a few extra seconds while this superstructure filled with water. In an attempt to speed this process, additional limber, or free-flooding, holes were drilled and cut into the superstructure to allow it to flood faster. By midwar, these measures combined with improved crew training got dive times down to 30–35 seconds, very fast for such a large boat and acceptable to the boat's crew.

The large size of these boats did negatively affect both surfaced and underwater maneuverability when compared to smaller submarines. No practical fix for this was available due to the limitations of the installed hydraulic systems used to move the rudder. Although a point of concern, the turning radius was still acceptable. After the war, a few fleet boats were fitted with an additional rudder topside at the very stern.

The class of boats had numerous crew comforts including air conditioning, refrigerated storage for food, generous freshwater distilling units, clothes washers, and bunks for nearly every crew member; these were luxuries virtually unheard of in other navies. The bureau designers felt that if a crew of 60–80 men were to be expected to conduct 75-day patrols in the warm waters of the Pacific, these types of features were vital to the health and efficiency of the crew. They could be added without impact to the boat's war fighting abilities due to the extra room of the big fleet boat. The air conditioning in particular had a very practical application, too, besides comfort. Should a submarine submerge for any length of time, the heat generated by the recently shut-down engines, electronic gear, and 70 warm bodies will quickly raise internal temperatures above . High humidity generated by tropical waters will quickly condense and begin dripping into equipment, eventually causing electrical shorts and fires. Air conditioning, acting mostly as a dehumidifier, virtually eliminates this problem and greatly increases mechanical and electrical reliability. It proved to be a key factor in the success of these boats during World War II.

Mine armament
Like the previous Tambor/Gar classes, the Gato class could substitute mines in place of torpedoes. For the Mk 10 and Mk 12 type mines used in World War II, each torpedo could be replaced by as many as two mines, giving the submarine a true maximum capacity of 48 mines. However, doctrine was to retain at least four torpedoes on mine laying missions, which further limits the capacity to 40 mines, and this is often stated as the maximum in various publications. In practice during the war, submarines went out with at least 8 torpedoes, and the largest minefields laid were 32 mines. Post-war, the Mk 49 mine replaced the Mk 12, while the larger Mk 27 mine was also carried which only allowed one mine replacing one torpedo.

Engine changes

Twelve submarines of this class built by Electric Boat received what would be the final installations of the Hooven-Owens-Rentschler (HOR) double-acting diesel engine. The Navy had been tinkering with this engine off and on since 1937 because its unique design promised nearly twice the horsepower in a package the same size as other diesel engine types. Unfortunately, the HOR company ran into severe design and manufacturing problems, and these engines proved to be operational and maintenance nightmares. Frequent breakdowns and utter unreliability had destroyed these engines' reputation with the Navy and they were all removed at the first opportunity and replaced by General Motors Cleveland
16-278A V-type diesels. The other Gato-class boats received either the Fairbanks-Morse 38D 8-1/8 nine-cylinder opposed-piston engine or the 
General Motors Cleveland 16-248 V-type as original installations. These engines were hardy, rugged, and well liked by the crews and served the boats quite well.

Fairwater changes
At the beginning of the war, Gato-class boats, as well as the Gar and Tambor classes, had fully shrouded fairwaters visually similar to modern nuclear submarines. Experience during the war led to the progressive reduction of this structure to reduce visibility and radar profile at the expense of underwater performance and foul-weather operating comfort. Most of the subs in postwar movies show the final result of these modifications. A side benefit of these modifications was the creation of convenient locations for antiaircraft guns.

Ships in class

Seventy-seven of these boats were commissioned from November 1941 through April 1944. Twenty of the 52 U.S. submarines lost in World War II were of this class, plus , a damaged boat that returned to the U.S., but was considered a constructive total loss and not repaired.

Occasionally, some confusion arises as to the number of Gato-class submarines built, with some sources listing the total as 73, due to the transitional nature of the first four boats (SS-361 through SS-364) constructed under the second contract by the Manitowoc Shipbuilding Company of Manitowoc, Wisconsin. These were originally intended to be Balao-class subs and were assigned hull numbers that fall in the middle of the range of numbers for the Balao class (SS-285 to SS-416, SS-425, and SS-426). Manitowoc was a designated follow-on yard to Electric Boat; they used construction blueprints and plans supplied by Electric Boat and used many of the same suppliers. The government-owned shipyards (Portsmouth Naval Shipyard and Mare Island Naval Shipyard) began to make the transition to the new Balao design in the summer of 1942. Electric Boat, due to the huge backlog of Gato-class construction, was not ready to make the transition to the new design until January 1943. Manitowoc had already completed their allotted production run of Gatos and could not switch over to the Balao design until Electric Boat supplied them with the plans. Faced with a work stoppage while they waited for Electric Boat to catch up, managers at Manitowoc got permission to complete four additional boats (SS-361 through SS-364) to Electric Boat's Gato-class plans.

World War II 

The Gato boats were authorized in appropriations for Fiscal Year 1941, as part of President Franklin Roosevelt's proclamation of "limited emergency" in September 1939. The first boat laid down was actually  at Portsmouth Naval Shipyard on 11 September 1940. She was commissioned on 1 November 1941, and was the only Gato-class boat in commission when the war started. Gato herself was laid down on 5 October 1940 by the Electric Boat Company at Groton, Connecticut, and commissioned 31 December 1941. Due to their large construction capacity, more than half (41) of the class was built at Electric Boat facilities; three new slipways were added to the north yard and four slipways were added to the south yard to accommodate their production. In addition, the government purchased an old foundry downstream from the main yard, constructed 10 slipways, and turned the yard over to Electric Boat. Called the Victory Yard, it became an integral part of Electric Boat operations. A total of 77 Gatos were built at four different locations (Electric Boat, Manitowoc, Portsmouth, and Mare Island).

All of the Gatos (with one exception) would eventually fight in the Pacific Theater of Operations. However, in the summer of 1942, six new Gatos were assigned to Submarine Squadron 50 and sent to Rosneath, Scotland, to patrol the Bay of Biscay and to assist in the Operation Torch landings in North Africa. All in all, they conducted 27 war patrols, but could not claim any verified sinkings. Considered a waste of valuable resources, in mid-1943, all six boats were recalled and transferred to the Pacific.

Once they began to arrive in theater in large numbers in mid-to-late 1942, the Gatos were in the thick of the fight against the Japanese.

Their principal weapon was the steam-powered Mark 14 torpedo in the early war years, with the electric Mark 18 torpedo supplementing the Mark 14 in late 1943. Due to a stunted research-and-development phase in the Depression-era 1930s, and in great part due to the arrogance and stubbornness of its designer, the Naval Torpedo Station Newport under the Bureau of Ordnance, the "wonder weapon" Mark 14 proved to be full of bugs and very unreliable. They tended to run too deep, explode prematurely, run erratically, or fail to detonate. Bowing to pressure from the submariners in the Pacific, the bureau eventually acknowledged the problems in the Mark 14 and largely corrected them by late 1943. The Mark 18 electric torpedo was a hastily copied version of captured German G7e torpedoes and was rushed into service in the fall of 1943. Unfortunately, it also was full of faults, the most dangerous being a tendency to run in a circular pattern and come back at the sub that fired it. Once perfected, both types of torpedoes proved to be reliable and effective weapons, allowing the Gatos and other submarines to sink an enormous amount of Japanese shipping by the end of the war.

The Gatos were subjected to numerous exterior configuration changes during their careers, with most of these changes centered on the conning tower fairwater. The large, bulky original configuration proved to be too easy to spot when the boat was surfaced; it needed to be smaller. Secondly, the desire to incorporate new masts for surface- and air-search radars drove changes to the fairwater and periscope shears. Third, additional gun armament was needed, and cutting down the fairwater provided excellent mounting locations for machine guns and antiaircraft cannon. The modifications (or mods) to the Gato-class conning tower fairwaters were fairly uniform in nature and they can be grouped together based on what was done when:
  Mod 1 – This is the original configuration with the covered navigation bridge, the high bulwark around the aft "cigarette" deck, and with the periscope shears plated over. All the early boats were built with this mod and it lasted until about mid-1942.
  Mod 2 – Same as mod 1, but with the bulwark around the cigarette deck cut down to reduce the silhouette. This also gave the .50 caliber machine gun mounted there a greatly improved arc of fire. Began to appear in about April 1942.
  Mod 3 – Same as mod 2, but with the covered navigation bridge on the forward part of the fairwater cut away and the plating around the periscope shears removed. In this configuration, the Gatos now had two excellent positions for the mounting of single 40 mm Bofors or twin 20 mm Oerlikon antiaircraft cannon, an improvement over the .50 caliber machine gun. This mod started to appear in late 1942 and early 1943.
  Mod 4 – Same as the mod 3, but with the height of the bridge itself lowered in a last attempt to lessen the silhouette. The lowering of the bridge exposed three I-beams on either side of the periscope shears. These exposed beams gave rise to the nickname "covered wagon boats". Began to appear in early 1944.

Variations on the above mods included the 1A (shortened navigation bridge), 2A (plating removed from periscope shears), and the 3A and 4A (which moved the SJ radar mast aft of the periscopes). The conning tower fairwater of Flasher is preserved in Groton, Connecticut, in the mod 4A configuration, with two single 40 mm Bofors mounts.

Deck guns varied during the war. Many targets in the Pacific War were sampans or otherwise not worth a torpedo, so the deck gun was an important weapon. Most boats began the war with a 3-inch (76 mm)/50 caliber Mk. 17 gun (although some boats received older Mk. 6 mounts due to shortages). The 3-inch gun was the model originally specified for the Gato class, but war experience led to the removal of 4-inch (102 mm)/50 caliber Mk. 9 guns from old S-class submarines to equip front-line boats. Beginning in late 1943, almost all were refitted with a 5-inch (127 mm)/25 caliber Mk. 17 gun, and some boats had two of these weapons. Additional antiaircraft guns included single 40 mm Bofors and twin 20 mm Oerlikon mounts, usually one of each.

Notable examples 
Taihō was the flagship of Vice-Admiral Jisaburo Ozawa's fleet during the Battle of the Philippine Sea and at the time Japan's newest carrier.
 , on her 12th patrol in July 1945, landed a small team from her crew on the shore of Patience Bay on Karafuto. They placed charges under a railroad track and blew up a passing train. Barb also conducted several rocket attacks against shore targets on this same patrol, the first ever by an American submarine. They used 5-inch unguided rockets fired from a special launching rack on the main deck.
Shōkaku was one of six Japanese carriers that had participated in the attack on Pearl Harbor.
  sank a ship carrying Japanese tank reinforcements that were en route to Iwo Jima.
  went to the rescue of a grounded Dutch submarine , taking its crew on board and destroying the submarine when it could not be removed from the reef, the only international submarine-to-submarine rescue in history.
  was the only U.S. submarine sunk by a Japanese submarine during the Second World War.
 along with  conducted an aggressive and successful attack against Japanese fleet units during the lead up to the U.S. invasion of Leyte Island in the Philippines in October 1944. A few hours later, while maneuvering back to the scene to finish off the crippled Takao, Darter ran hard aground on Bombay Shoal off Palawan. Her entire crew was rescued and subsequent attempts to destroy the wreck were only partially successful. As late as 1998, portions of Darters hulk were still visible on the reef.
  recovered downed pilot LTJG George H. W. Bush, future President of the United States, after his Grumman TBM Avenger torpedo bomber was damaged and eventually ditched during a bombing mission at Chichi-jima in the Pacific.
  was the second-highest scoring U.S. boat of the war, with 100,231 tons officially credited to her by the Joint Army–Navy Assessment Committee (JANAC).
 's skipper, Howard W. Gilmore, earned the submarine force's first combat Medal of Honor for sacrificing his life to save his boat and his crew. Alone on the bridge after being wounded by enemy gunfire, and unable to reach the hatch after he had ordered the others below, he pressed his face to the phone and uttered the order that saved his boat and sealed his doom: "Take 'er down!"
 In , Mannert L. Abele earned the submarine force's first Navy Cross, when his boat engaged in a running battle with Japanese ships off Kiska in July 1942. Grunion was subsequently lost in this action. In 2006 and 2007, expeditions organized and led by Abele's sons, Bruce, Brad, and John, located and photographed the wreck of the Grunion using side-scan sonar and a remotely operated vehicle.
 was essentially the 53rd U.S. submarine loss of the war. Terribly damaged in an aircraft-borne depth charge attack on 14 November 1944, she barely limped back to port in Saipan. Temporarily patched up, she was sent back to the United States. Examined by engineers, she was found to be beyond economical repair and was decommissioned on 18 July 1945, never having made another war patrol. Her entire crew survived.
  was commanded by Samuel D. Dealey, the only submarine commander of the war (perhaps the only one ever) to sink five enemy destroyers, four in a single patrol.
 , which sank two Japanese ships during her patrols, was lent to the Japanese Maritime Self Defense Force after the war, serving under the name Kuroshio.
 's notable record during World War II included eight patrols in the Pacific. She sank the third- or second-most tonnage during the war. She served the U.S. Navy until 1967.
  became famous in Edward L. "Ned" Beach's book Submarine! (which was a kind of eulogy to her).
 sank the Japanese submarine I-42 on the night of 23 March 1944, after the two subs dueled for position for over an hour.
 , commanded by one of the submarine force's most famous skippers, Dudley W. "Mush" Morton, engaged in a running gun and torpedo battle with a convoy of four ships off the coast of New Guinea and destroyed the entire convoy. She was also one of the first U.S. subs into the Sea of Japan. She was sunk while exiting the Sea of Japan through the La Perouse Strait in October 1943 while on her seventh patrol.

Postwar service
At the end of World War II, the U.S. Navy found itself in an awkward position. The 56 remaining Gato-class submarines, designed to fight an enemy that no longer existed, were largely obsolete, despite the fact they were only two to four years old. Such was the pace of technological development during the war that a submarine with only a 300-foot test depth was going to be of little use, despite being modern in most other aspects. Enough of the Balao and Tench boats, with their greater diving depth, remained that the Gatos were superfluous for front-line missions. The Greater Underwater Propulsion Power Program (GUPPY) modernization program of the late 1940s largely passed these boats by. Only  and  received GUPPY conversions; these were austere GUPPY IB modernizations under project SCB 47A prior to their transfer to the Italian Navy. However, the U.S. Navy found itself new missions to perform, and for some of these the Gatos were well suited.

Radar picket

The advent of the kamikaze demonstrated the need for a long-range radar umbrella around the fleet. Surface ships refitted with powerful radar suites were put into service, but they proved vulnerable in this role, as they could be attacked as well, leaving the fleet blind. A submarine, though, could dive and escape aerial attack. Two Gato-class boats ( and ) received rudimentary conversions to radar pickets before the end of World War II, but were not used in this role. After further experimenting with the concept on four Balao and Tench-class boats under Projects Migraine I and II, and realizing that a deep diving depth was not overly important in this role, six Gatos were taken in hand (and ) for conversion under Project Migraine III (aka SCB 12A). They also received a streamlined "sail" in place of the traditional conning tower fairwater. Redesignated as SSRs, these boats were only moderately successful in this role, as the radars themselves proved troublesome and somewhat unreliable. The radars were removed and the boats temporarily reverted to general-purpose submarines after 1959.

Hunter-killer

The threat of the Soviet Navy building hundreds of Type XXI-derived submarines (eventually the 215-strong  and dozens of others) in the Atlantic led the U.S. Navy to adapt submarines to specifically hunt other submarines, a radically new role for the 1950s. Concluding that this role did not require a fast or deep-diving submarine (this line of thought would quickly change with the advent of nuclear power), seven Gatos were converted to SSKs (hunter-killer submarines) between 1951 and 1953, joining three purpose-built K-1-class SSKs entering service at that time. The Gato class was chosen because large numbers were available in the reserve fleet should rapid mobilization become necessary, and the deeper-diving classes were more suitable for GUPPY rather than SSK conversions. A streamlined GUPPY-style sail was installed, a large sonar array was wrapped around the bow (losing two torpedo tubes in the process), the boats were extensively silenced including the removal of the two forward diesel engines, and they received a snorkel.  was converted under project SCB 58 as the test boat for the concept, having her sonar array at the forward end of the sail instead of the better position at the bow.

Eventually more advanced sonars were installed on the new nuclear boats: , commissioned in 1960, introduced the bow-mounted sonar sphere. Tullibee was an attempt to develop a slow but ultra-quiet nuclear-powered SSK equivalent; no others were built due to her unexpectedly high cost relative to the more capable , and the SSK mission was folded into the regular attack submarine role. The slow and less capable diesel SSKs were decommissioned or reassigned to other roles in 1959, and all except Croaker and Cavalla (eventually preserved as memorials) were scrapped in 1968 and 1969.

Guided-missile submarine

The Regulus nuclear cruise missile program of the 1950s provided the U.S. Navy with its first strategic missile capability.  was converted under SCB 28 in 1953 to house and fire this large surface-launched missile and was designated SSG (guided-missile submarine). She could carry two of the missiles in a cylindrical hangar on the aft deck. She made strategic deterrent patrols with Regulus until 1964, when the program was discontinued in favor of Polaris.<ref name=DANFSTunny>{{harvnb|DANFS Tunny}}</ref>

Transport submarine
With the retirement of the Regulus missile system in 1965,  was converted into a troop transport in 1966. She was redesignated as an APSS (transport submarine), replacing  in this role. Her Regulus hangar became a lockout chamber for UDT, SEAL, and Marine Force Recon teams in the Vietnam War.

Submarine oiler

 was converted under SCB 39 to a SSO in 1950 to carry fuel oil, gasoline, and cargo to amphibious beachheads. She received additional "saddle" tanks wrapped around her outer hull to carry these fuels and a streamlined sail. After a few tests, the concept was dropped in 1951 as impractical, and Guavina served in the test role for a few years under the designation AGSS. In 1957, she converted back to the oiler/tanker role and carried the designation AOSS. This time, she experimented with refueling seaplanes at sea, which was potentially important, as refueling the nuclear-capable Martin P6M Seamaster at sea could improve the Navy's strategic strike capabilities. However, this mission, too, was dropped and Guavina was decommissioned.

Sonar test submarine

The development of advanced sonar systems took on a great deal of importance in the 1950s, and several fleet boats were outfitted with various strange-looking sonar transducer arrays and performed extensive tests. Grouper had all her forward torpedo tubes removed and the space was used as berthing for technicians and as a sonar lab. Flying Fish was decommissioned in 1954, but Grouper continued in the test role until 1968.

Naval Reserve trainer
Interested in maintaining a ready pool of trained reservists, the Navy assigned numerous fleet boats to various coastal and inland ports (even in Great Lakes ports such as Chicago, Cleveland, and Detroit) where they served as a training platform during the reservists' weekend drills. Twenty-eight Gato-class boats served in this capacity, some as late as 1971. In this role, the boats were rendered incapable of diving and had their propellers removed. They were used strictly as pierside trainers. These were in commission, but classed as "in commission in reserve", thus some were decommissioned and recommissioned on the same day to reflect the change in status.All post war data from 

Foreign service
The large numbers of relatively modern, but surplus U.S. fleet submarines proved to be popular in sales, loans, or leases to allied foreign navies. While most of these boats were of the more capable Balao and Tench classes, some Gatos went overseas, as well. Italy received two ( and ), which received the only GUPPY conversions given to Gato-class boats (Guppy IB). Japan received one, Brazil two ( and ), Greece two ( and ), and Turkey two ( and ). The boats transferred to Japan and Brazil did not receive any modernizations (streamlining and snorkels) prior to transfer, but the four boats sent to Greece and Turkey did receive snorkels and partial streamlining to the fairwater.

 Museum boats 
Six Gato-class submarines are open to public viewing. They primarily depend on revenue generated by visitors to keep them operational and up to U.S. Navy standards; each boat gets a yearly inspection and a "report card". Some boats, such as Cod and Silversides, have been used in film production.

 Surviving ships 

The following is a complete list of Gato-class museum boats:

  is at Seawolf Park near Galveston, Texas (in SSK configuration).
  is at the Wisconsin Maritime Museum in Manitowoc, Wisconsin.
  is on display at North Coast Harbor in Cleveland, Ohio.
  is on display at the Buffalo and Erie County Naval & Military Park in Buffalo, New York (in SSK configuration)
  is on display on shore at Battleship Memorial Park in Mobile, Alabama.
  is on display in Muskegon, Michigan.

See also
 List of most successful American submarines in World War II
 Allied submarines in the Pacific War
 Unrestricted submarine warfare
 List of lost United States submarines
 List of submarines of the Second World War
 Ship Characteristics Board (SCB) - postwar project management

References

Citations

Sources
 
 
 
 
 
 
 
 
 
 
 
 
 

External links

 On Eternal Patrol, website for lost U.S. subs
 Gato (SS-212) Class Line Drawings from NavSource Online: Submarine Photo Archive
 Gato (SS-212) Construction – Service Photos from NavSource Online: Submarine Photo Archive
 Fleet Type Submarine Training Manual San Francisco Maritime Museum ( a Balao-class submarine)
 Dive Detectives Dive Detectives TV series looks for Flier and Robalo'' (Archived link from www.history.ca).
 Description of GUPPY conversions at RNSubs.co.uk
 GUPPY and other diesel boat conversions page (partial archive)
 Whitman, Edward C. "Cold War Curiosities: U.S. Radar Picket Submarines, Undersea Warfare, Winter-Spring 2002, Issue 14 
 Navsource.org fleet submarines photo index page
 List of World War II U.S. submarines at FleetSubmarine.com (archived)
 DiGiulian, Tony Navweaps.com later 3"/50 caliber gun
 DiGiulian, Tony Navweaps.com 4"/50 caliber gun
 DiGiulian, Tony Navweaps.com 5"/25 caliber gun

Submarine classes
 
 Gato
 Gato
 Gato
 Gato